"Love Reunited" is a song written by Chris Hillman and Steve Hill, and recorded by American country music group The Desert Rose Band.  It was released in July 1987 as the second single from the album The Desert Rose Band.  The song reached number 6 on the Billboard Hot Country Singles & Tracks chart.

Chart performance

References

1987 singles
The Desert Rose Band songs
Songs written by Chris Hillman
Song recordings produced by Paul Worley
MCA Records singles
Curb Records singles
1987 songs